Legendary Warriors may refer to:

Movies

Video games
 Kung Fu Panda: Legendary Warriors, a video game for the Nintendo DS and Wii based on the Kung Fu Panda movie series

Other uses 
 Ten Legendary Warriors (Digimon) in the Digimon Frontier anime series